David "Dink" Widenhouse (born January 1, 1932 in Concord, North Carolina) is a retired NASCAR Grand National Series driver.

Widenhouse began racing at the age of fifteen when his brother built a dirt track near Concord, NC. Dink's first car was a '37 Ford Coach with what would become his trademark "B-29" emblem on the side.

While he never won a race, he managed to gain a pole position at the 1955 running of the Wilkes County 160 (now the First Union 400) finishing 19th in that race. Widenhouse had a successful racing career at the Charlotte fairgrounds, Midland, Concord, Myrtle Beach and Columbia, SC and Danville Virginia. Part of his success stemmed from his great mechanic "Greaseball Young". His racing career came to an end in the 1960s when paved tracks became the norm. Widenhouse always preferred dirt and did not like racing on pavement. During his racing career, he won nearly 200 races, with his record including 21 wins in one season. He was known as "the Preacher" because he never raced on Sunday.

Widenhouse's career earnings were $3,225 USD ($ when adjusted for inflation). His only last place finish came at an untitled 1955 race at Southern State Fairgrounds in Charlotte, North Carolina.

References

 
 
 1955 Untitled Race at Southern State Fairgrounds Information
 Dink Widenhouse Papers, J Murrey Atkins Library, UNC Charlotte
 Oral History Interview with Dink Widenhouse

1932 births
Living people
NASCAR drivers
People from Concord, North Carolina
Racing drivers from Charlotte, North Carolina
Racing drivers from North Carolina